Pterolophia binaluanica is a species of beetle in the family Cerambycidae. It was described by Stephan von Breuning and de Jong in 1941.

References

binaluanica
Beetles described in 1941